Love + Hate is a 2005 British drama film directed by Dominic Savage.

Plot

Love + Hate is a modern love story set across the racial divide in a town in northern England. Adam has been brought up in a home and community that fosters racism. Naseema is a girl from the same town. But what Adam and Naseema really share is a secret desire to break free of their small town and its inhibitions, something they discover while working together in a DIY store. At first resistant, they cannot avoid their mutual attraction, and embark on a relationship which threatens to bring down their families as well as themselves.

Location
Love + Hate was filmed in Blackburn and partially set in a wallpaper shop in the town.

Cast
Miriam Ali –  Naseema's mother
Dean Andrews – Derek
Samina Awan – Naseema
Liam Barr – Sean's friend
Liam Boyle – Steve
Nichola Burley – Michelle
Tom Hudson – Adam
Ryan Leslie – Sean
Michael McNulty – Shane
Peter O'Connor –  Pete
Mohammed Rafique – Naseema's father
Wasim Zakir – Yousif (as Was Zakir)
Aliya Bhatti – Azara
Tracy Brabin – Gaynor
Katy Sharples – Roxanne
Umar Ali – Umar
Stephen Swan – Lifeguard

Soundtrack
Perfect little secret, Snow Patrol.
Run, Snow Patrol.
Play, Stephen Fretwell.
Sweet Fantastic, Ian Brown.
Sunshine, Keane.

References

External links 

2005 films
BBC Film films
British romantic drama films
2005 romantic drama films
2000s English-language films
Films about interracial romance
Films scored by Rupert Gregson-Williams
2000s British films